The Great Amateur (Swedish: Den store amatören) is a 1958 Swedish comedy film directed by Hasse Ekman and starring Martin Ljung, Marianne Bengtsson and Yngve Gamlin. It was shot at the Råsunda in Stockholm. The film's sets were designed by the art director P.A. Lundgren.

Cast
Martin Ljung as constable Alfred Erlandsson
Marianne Bengtsson as Linda Svensson
Hasse Ekman as Max Wallby, Theatre director
Yngve Gamlin as Lilja, mayor in Fårtuna
Sven-Eric Gamble as Roffe, Max valet
Einar Axelsson as Victor Wirén
Brita Borg as artist "Fat Mammy Brown"/Viking woman
Bullan Weijden as Olga af Klinting
Berndt Westerberg as Police Commissary
Margit Andelius as Ms Krans-Wetterlund
Ludde Juberg as kapellmeister in anniversary play
Povel Ramel as artist, Viking in anniversary play
 John Melin as 	Grönwall
 Georg Skarstedt as 	Nibbelöf
 Hanny Schedin as 	Linda's Aunt
 John Norrman as 	Auto Repair Man
 Astrid Bodin as Ms. Knarring
 Karl Erik Flens as Torsten, Actor 
 Marianne Nielsen as Desdemona in 'Othello'
 Wiktor Andersson as 	Oskar, Electrician 
 Bellan Roos as 	Mrs. Lithander
 Birgitta Andersson as Lita 
 Gerd Andersson as 	Dancer 
 Axel Högel as 	Jonasson, Janitor 
 Jan Kings as 	Kalle, School Pupil 
 Curt Löwgren as 	Messenger from the Mayor 
 Olof Olsson as Major af Klinting 
 Lars-Evert Peterson as Ulf, School Pupil 
 Teddy Rhodin as 	Dancer 
 Bo Samuelsson as Photographer 
 Håkan Serner as Actor

References

Bibliography 
 Gustafsson, Fredrik. The Man from the Third Row: Hasse Ekman, Swedish Cinema and the Long Shadow of Ingmar Bergman. Berghahn Books, 2016.

External links

1958 films
Films directed by Hasse Ekman
Swedish comedy films
1958 comedy films
1950s Swedish-language films
Films scored by Erik Nordgren
1950s Swedish films